This is the list of events held and announced to be held in the Simón Bolívar Park, including events at the Sports' Palace (Palacio de los Deportes) complex.

Concerts

Concerts held in Events Plaza:

Concerts held in the Palacio De Los Deportes Arena:

Festivals

References

Lists of events by venue
Lists of events in Colombia